Springfield is a city in Bon Homme County, South Dakota, United States. The population was 1,914 at the 2020 census. As of 2012, about 1,200 of the residents were inmates at Mike Durfee State Prison.

Springfield was named on account of there being numerous natural springs in the area.

Geography
Springfield is located at  (42.854763, -97.894814).

Springfield has been assigned the ZIP code 57062 and the FIPS place code 60660.

Springfield is located on the north shore of Lewis and Clark Lake, a 31,000-acre impoundment of the Missouri River.

Demographics

2010 census
As of the census of 2010, there were 1,989 people, 352 households, and 200 families residing in the city. The racial makeup of the city was 70.7% White, 2.9% African American, 23.3% Native American, 0.1% Asian, 0.6% from other races, and 2.4% from two or more races. Hispanic or Latino of any race were 3.7% of the population.

There were 352 households, of which 22.7% had children under the age of 18 living with them, 46.9% were married couples living together, 7.4% had a female householder with no husband present, 2.6% had a male householder with no wife present, and 43.2% were non-families. 41.2% of all households were made up of individuals, and 21% had someone living alone who was 65 years of age or older. The average household size was 2.00 and the average family size was 2.66.

The median age in the city was 37 years. 8.8% of residents were under the age of 18; 13.3% were between the ages of 18 and 24; 42.2% were from 25 to 44; 25.1% were from 45 to 64; and 10.6% were 65 years of age or older. The gender makeup of the city was 81.1% male and 18.9% female.

2000 census
As of the census of 2000, there were 792 people, 356 households, and 218 families residing in the city. The population density was 1,211.6 people per square mile (470.5/km2). There were 400 housing units at an average density of 611.9 per square mile (237.6/km2). The racial makeup of the city was 93.43% White, 0.38% African American, 4.80% Native American, and 1.39% from two or more races. Hispanic or Latino of any race were 0.25% of the population.

There were 356 households, out of which 26.4% had children under the age of 18 living with them, 50.6% were married couples living together, 8.4% had a female householder with no husband present, and 38.5% were non-families. 33.1% of all households were made up of individuals, and 14.0% had someone living alone who was 65 years of age or older. The average household size was 2.22 and the average family size was 2.77.

In the city, the population was spread out, with 25.0% under the age of 18, 6.3% from 18 to 24, 22.5% from 25 to 44, 22.9% from 45 to 64, and 23.4% who were 65 years of age or older. The median age was 42 years. For every 100 females, there were 91.3 males. For every 100 females age 18 and over, there were 89.8 males.

As of 2000 the median income for a household in the city was $29,464, and the median income for a family was $40,625. Males had a median income of $25,227 versus $21,071 for females. The per capita income for the city was $15,863. About 8.5% of families and 9.1% of the population were below the poverty line, including 9.2% of those under age 18 and 10.2% of those age 65 or over.

Mike Durfee State Prison
Springfield is home of the Mike Durfee State Prison. It is named for Mike Durfee, who was a standout athlete and teacher at University of South Dakota–Springfield. It opened under the name of Springfield State Prison in 1984, with women from the prison at Yankton. It became coed in 1985 with males being admitted. It became all male in 1997 when the women were transferred to Herm Solem Public Safety Center in Pierre. In 1999, it was named for Mike Durfee, who had been with the school and was Deputy Director of the South Dakota Department of Corrections.

The prison currently has approximately 1,200 low to medium security inmates and is a major regional employer.

Recreation
Springfield is a notable destination for recreation including hunting and fishing along the upper portions of Lewis and Clark Lake. The South Dakota Department of Game, Fish, and Parks operates the Springfield State Recreation Area with 20 campsites, boat ramp, and golf course along the lake.

Veteran's Memorial Park(also known by Terrace Park by its locals) sits atop a bluff with scenic views of Lewis and Clark Lake and the Missouri River.

Notable people
 Maria Pearson, Yankton Sioux activist, was born in Springfield
 Mel Tjeerdsma, past president of the American Football Coaches Association, grew up near Springfield

See also
Lewis and Clark Lake

References

External links
Springfield Chamber of Commerce
Springfield State Recreation Area

Cities in Bon Homme County, South Dakota
Cities in South Dakota
South Dakota populated places on the Missouri River
Populated places established in 1881
1881 establishments in Dakota Territory